Grand Slam: World Class Tennis is a 1986 video game published by Infinity Software.

Gameplay

Grand Slam: World Class Tennis is a game in which the Grand Slam tournament is played.

Reception
Frank C. Boosman reviewed the game for Computer Gaming World, and stated that "I like to think of GS as a diamond in the rough: pretty, but even more so once it has been cut and polished."

David M. Wilson and Johnny L. Wilson reviewed the game for Computer Gaming World, and stated that "the action is where it is at and Grand Slam Tennis is an action game which is sophisticated enough to know that position is truly important in tennis."

Reviews
ACE (Advanced Computer Entertainment) - December 1987
ASM (Aktueller Software Markt) - April 1987
Tilt - April 1987
Raze - December 1990

References

External links
Review in Info
Review in Amiga World
Review in Macworld
Review in Enigma (Italian)
Review in MacUser

1986 video games
Amiga games
Classic Mac OS games
Tennis video games
Video games developed in the United States